78P/Gehrels, also known as Gehrels 2, is a Jupiter-family periodic comet in the Solar System with a current orbital period of 7.22 years.

It was discovered by Tom Gehrels at the Lunar and Planetary Laboratory, Arizona, USA on photographic plates exposed between 29 September and 5 October 1973 at the Palomar Observatory. It had a brightness of apparent magnitude of 15. Brian G. Marsden computed the parabolic and elliptical orbits which suggested an orbital period of 8.76 years, later revising the data to give a perihelion date of 30 November 1963 and orbital period of 7.93 years.

The comet's predicted next appearance in 1981 was observed by W. and A. Cochran at the McDonald Observatory, Texas on 8 June 1981. It was observed again in 1989 and in 1997, when favourable conditions meant that brightness increased to magnitude 12. It has subsequently been observed in 2004 when it reached magnitude 10, 2012, and 2018.

Outward migration 
Comet 78P/Gehrels' aphelion (furthest distance from the Sun) of 5.4AU is in the zone of control of the giant planet Jupiter and the orbit of the comet is frequently perturbed by Jupiter. On September 15, 2029, the comet will pass within 0.018 AU (2.7 million kilometers) of Jupiter and be strongly perturbed.  By the year 2200, the comet will have a centaur-like orbit with a perihelion (closest distance to the Sun) near Jupiter. This outward migration from a perihelion of 2AU to a perihelion of ~5AU could cause the comet to go dormant.

See also
 List of numbered comets

References

External links
Orbital simulation from JPL (Java) / Horizons Ephemeris
78P/Gehrels – Minor Planet Center
78P/Gehrels 2 (2012)
78P at Kronk's Cometography
 Lightcurve (Artyom Novichonok)
78P as seen by 10" GRAS-04 on 2011-05-03 (120 sec x 6)
78P as seen by  Schmidt-Cassegrain on 2011 08 06 (3 x 748 sec) and 2011 08 09 (6 x 600 sec)

Periodic comets
0078
Comets in 2012
Comets in 2019
19730929